Out West is a 1947 short subject directed by Edward Bernds starring American slapstick comedy team The Three Stooges (Moe Howard, Larry Fine and Shemp Howard). It is the 99th entry in the series released by Columbia Pictures starring the comedians, who released 190 shorts for the studio between 1934 and 1959.

Plot
Shemp is suffering from an enlarged vein in his leg, and fears that it will lead to amputation. His doctor (Vernon Dent), however, advises that a few weeks in the old west will cure him. Upon arrival in a somewhat lawless town, the boys befriend the ruthless Doc Barker (Norman Willis). Barker listens to Shemp's story about his bad leg, mistaking "the biggest vein you ever saw" for a gold-bearing vein worth millions. The Stooges take a liking to Barker, but are later informed by the beautiful Nell (Christine McIntyre) that he is an outlaw who is holding the Arizona Kid (Jock Mahoney) hostage in the basement of the saloon.

The boys devise a plan to obtain the prison cell keys from Barker's coat. Shemp joins the outlaw in a game of Poker, while Moe and Larry prepare beverages for the card players. The two find every possible deadly chemical they can to add to their volatile drink, from Old Homicide to paint (plus paint remover). They also prepare a Sarsaparilla for Shemp to make sure their pal does not indulge in the suicidal drink. Barker downs the concoction, and screams for water. Shemp grabs a nearby fire hose and sprays the entire gang, soaking them. Moe and Larry quickly grab Barker's coat (claiming he will catch pneumonia) and get the cell keys to Nell, who frees the Arizona Kid. When Barker sees what has happened, he throws Larry in the cell with plans to kill him at sundown.

Seeing how desperate the situation has become, the Arizona Kid goes to retrieve the United States Cavalry while Moe and Shemp attempt to free Larry using every tool they can find. Eventually, they spring Larry and defeat Barker and his gang.

Production notes
Out West was filmed July 8–11, 1946, and is the second short to feature Shemp Howard, taking the place of his brother Curly Howard. The film is also a remake of Pistol Packing Nitwits starring Harry Langdon and El Brendel. It would later be remade in 1954 as Pals and Gals, using ample stock footage.

The congested vein is originally in Shemp's right leg, but he favors his left leg throughout the film.
It was reworked of 1940’s Go West starring The Marx Brothers (Groucho Marx. Chico Marx and Harpo Marx) release by MGM.

References

External links 
 
 
 Out West at threestooges.net

1947 films
1947 short films
1940s Western (genre) comedy films
The Three Stooges films
American black-and-white films
Columbia Pictures short films
Films directed by Edward Bernds
American Western (genre) comedy films
1947 comedy films
1940s English-language films
1940s American films